RRDtool (round-robin database tool) aims to handle time series data such as network bandwidth, temperatures or CPU load. The data is stored in a circular buffer based database, thus the system storage footprint remains constant over time.

It also includes tools to extract round-robin data in a graphical format, for which it was originally intended.
Bindings exist for several programming languages, e.g. Perl, Python, Ruby, Tcl, PHP and Lua. There is an independent full Java implementation called rrd4j.

General data storage
RRDtool assumes time-variable data in intervals of a certain length. This interval, usually named step, is specified upon creation of an RRD file and cannot be changed afterwards. Because data may not always be available at just the right time, RRDtool will automatically interpolate any submitted data to fit its internal time-steps.

The value for a specific step, that has been interpolated, is named a primary data point (PDP). Multiple PDPs may be consolidated according to a consolidation function (CF) to form a consolidated data point (CDP). Typical consolidation functions are average, minimum, maximum.

After the data has been consolidated, the resulting CDP is stored in a round-robin archive (RRA). A round-robin archive stores a fixed number of CDPs and specifies how many PDPs should be consolidated into one CDP and which CF to use. The total time covered by an RRA can be calculated as follows:

 time covered = (#CDPs stored) × (#PDPs per CDP) × (step time length)

After this time the archive will "wrap around": the next insertion will overwrite the oldest entry. This behavior in this context is referred to as "round-robin" and is the reason for the program's name.  However this is different from the common computer science definition, which is a method of distributing resources among multiple consumers or processes.

To cover several timespans and/or use several consolidation functions, an RRD file may contain multiple RRAs. The data retrieval function of RRDtool automatically selects the archive with the highest resolution that still covers the requested timespan. This mechanism is also used by RRDtool's graphing subsystem.

Release history

The following table contains the release history of RRDtool, showing its major releases.

Other tools that use RRDtool as a DBMS and/or graphing subsystem 

 BackupPC
 Cacti
 Cherokee
 collectd
 Cricket
 Ganglia – system monitor clusters and grids
 lighttpd
 Lpar2rrd
 Monitorix
 MRTG
 Munin
 Nagios
 Nmon
 NMIS
 ntop
 OpenNMS
 pfSense
 Plesk
 Xymon
 Zenoss Core

See also

RRD Editor
 Time series database

References

External links

Internet Protocol based network software
Free network management software
Free software programmed in C
Free database management systems
1999 software
Time series software